St. Urbain's Horseman is a Canadian television drama miniseries, broadcast on CBC Television in the 2007–2008 television season. Based on the novel by Mordecai Richler, the series starred David Julian Hirsh, Selina Giles Elliott Gould and Andrea Martin. It was directed by Peter Moss.

External links

2000s Canadian television miniseries
CBC Television original programming
2007 Canadian television series debuts
English-language Canadian films